The 1989 Ole Miss Rebels football team represented the University of Mississippi during the 1989 NCAA Division I-A football season.

Schedule

Personnel

Season summary

Memphis

at Florida

References

Ole Miss
Ole Miss Rebels football seasons
Liberty Bowl champion seasons
Ole Miss Rebels football